The 2nd Central Committee (2nd CC) of the Workers' Party of Korea (WPK) was elected at the 2nd Congress on 30 March 1948, and remained in session until the election of the 3rd Central Committee on 29 April 1956. In between party congresses and specially convened conferences the Central Committee is the highest decision-making institution in the WPK and North Korea. The 2nd Central Committee was not a permanent institution and delegated day-to-day work to elected bodies, such as the Political Committee, the Standing Committee, the Organisation Committee and the Inspection Committee in this case. It convened meetings, known as "Plenary Session of the [term] Central Committee", to discuss major policies. Only full members had the right to vote, but if a full member could not attend a plenary session, the person's spot was taken over by an alternate. Plenary session could also be attended by non-members, such meetings are known as "Enlarged Plenary Session", to participate in the committee's discussions. During its tenure it held five plenary sessions, one enlarged session, seven joint plenary sessions and four stand-alone plenums.

A feature of North Korean politics was its factionalism. Four loosely defined factions were struggling for dominance; Kim Il-sung's partisans, domestic communists, the Yanan group and the Soviet Koreans. The 2nd CC, which consisted of 67 members and 20 alternate members, was divided along factional lines. Of the 67 members, 30 had served in the 1st Central Committee. Among those not reelected were Chon Song-hwa and Chong Tal-hyon from the domestic faction. The position of the partisan faction was strengthened, with Kang Kon, Kim Kwang-hyop, Kim Kyong-sok and Pak Kum-chol being elected to the 2nd Central Committee. Despite this, the domestic faction had the most representation on the 2nd CC. Further the 2nd CC reelected Yanan communist Kim Tu-bong as Chairman of the Central Committee while partisan Kim Il-sung and Chu Yong-ha from the domestic group were elected to the office of Vice Chairman. All the members of the 1st Political Committee were re-elected, while two new were added; Kim Chaek and Pak Il-u. Upon the merger of the Workers' Party of North Korea and the Workers' Party of South Korea (WPSK) on 24 June 1949, the 2nd Central Committee merged with the 1st WPSK Central Committee and gained 31 new members. The newly expanded 2nd CC elected Kim Il-sung as chairman and domestic communist Pak Hon-yong and Soviet Korean Ho Ka-i as vice chairmen. Also, Ho Ka-i with domestic communists (and former WPSK members) Yi Sung-yop and Kim Sam-yong were elected First, Second and Third Secretary respectively in charge of administrative affairs. Thirty-six individuals were re-elected to the 3rd Central Committee, of these 29 were original members of the WPNK's 2nd CC.

The first moves to purge the domestic faction from WPK political life began at the 5th Joint Plenary Session, held 15–18 December 1952. In his report to the plenum Kim Il-sung talked about defects in party work and accused certain people, without mentioning names, of lacking proper "Party character", forsaking the masses, not performing duties assigned to them and not criticising party policy through proper party channels. Shortly after the plenary session Yim Hwa was arrested for writing for anti-communist thinking for writing the following lines in a poem; "Forests were put to the fire; houses were burned. If Stalin comes to Korea, there is not a house to put him up for the night." Continuing up to December 1952 several other figures were arrested, such as Kim Nam-chon, Kim Ki-rim, Kim O-song and Kwon O-jik. Several others were secretly arrested as the purge was carried outside the public eye. On 15 February 1953 an editorial in Rodong Sinmun stated that, in line with the 5th Joint Plenary Session, certain factionalists had become a "target of our hatred". Mentioned by name was Yim Hwa, Chu Yong-ha, Kim Nam-chon and Cho Il-hae, but the editorial noted that there were "others" as well. They were charged with "not trusting the Party, and with slandering Party Policy and Party leadership." The editorial noted that the Party had been tolerant of their behaviour, but stated that when given the chance to apologise the accused did not admit their mistakes and/or gave half-hearted apologies. Chu Yong-ha, instead of apologising for his supposed misdeeds, openly criticised the leadership of the WPK. While no public criticism was aired at Pak Hon-yong at the time, he was not heard, seen in public or reported on since February 1953.

Around the same time, the Kim Il-sung group moved against WPK First Secretary Ho Ka-i, who under pressure either committed suicide or was murdered on 2 July 1953. The suicide was announced at the 6th Joint Plenary Session, held on 4–6 August 1953, as well as the expulsion from the party of Pak Hon-yong and other leading WPSK officials. During the plenum, on 3–6 August, a trial conducted by the Military Tribunal Department of the Supreme Court involving twelve defendants was organised. The defendants were accused of spying for the United States Government and infiltrating the North Korean Government and the WPK. Pak Hon-yong, as the ringleader of the alleged conspiracy, was accused of seeking to overthrow the North Korean government and thethe WPK leadership, and seeking to restore capitalism. Pak Hon-yong was not put on trial before 15 December 1955, in which he was trialled by a special session of the Supreme Court in which the judges were leading politicians of the WPK. He was accused of becoming "a traitor of the revolution" in 1939 and of "disguising himself as a patriot", and was executed for his supposed crimes on 18 December 1955. This supposed conspiracy helped explain North Korea's defeat in the Korean War, and further rationalise Kim Il-sung's growing dominance over the WPK and state machinery.

Plenary sessions

Members

1st Plenary Session (1946–49)

Full

Alternates

1st Joint Plenary Session (1949–56)

Noter

References

Citations

Bibliography
Books:
 
 
  
 
 

Dissertations:
 

2nd Central Committee of the Workers' Party of Korea
1948 establishments in North Korea
1956 disestablishments in North Korea